Steve "The Growler" Dolloff is an American retired ice hockey center who was an All-American for Boston University and helped the program win its first two national championships.

Career
Dolloff began attending Boston University in 1969, playing on the freshman team, and nearly had his career ended by a serious injury. While playing against Dartmouth, Dolloff took a stick in the eye and was rushed to the hospital. Both eyes were bandaged for nearly a week and there were fears that he would lose the sight in one eye but he managed to make a full recovery. Dolloff joined the varsity team the following season and provided depth scoring for the Terriers, helping the club go 28–2–1 while winning their first NCAA championship.

He continued to chip in when needed in 1972 as the Terriers captured both the conference and national championships, joining a very short list of players to win back-to-back national titles. As a senior, Dolloff was at the center of the offense and finished second on the team with 52 points, improving his career high by 15 points. Unfortunately, the two-time champions were upset by Pennsylvania in the first round of the conference tournament and weren't able to defend their crown. Dolloff, however, was named to the All-American team at the end of the season.

After graduating, Dolloff joined the Oklahoma City Blazers, a farm team for the Toronto Maple Leafs, and played two seasons of professional hockey. Despite being one of the team top scorers, and helping the Blazers reach the Adams Cup final in 1974, Dolloff never played above the minor league level and he retired after one more season with the Tidewater Sharks.

Career statistics

Regular season and playoffs

Awards and honors

References

External links

1951 births
Living people
American ice hockey centers
Ice hockey players from Massachusetts
People from Melrose, Massachusetts
Boston University Terriers men's ice hockey players
Oklahoma City Blazers (1965–1977) players
Sportspeople from Middlesex County, Massachusetts
Tidewater Sharks players
NCAA men's ice hockey national champions
AHCA Division I men's ice hockey All-Americans